Suzak is a village in Shahrixon District, Andijan Region, Uzbekistan.

Populated places in Andijan Region